Paul Arditti is a British sound designer, working mainly in the UK and the US. He specialises in designing sound systems and sound scores for theatre. He has won awards for his work on both musicals and plays, including a Tony Award, an Olivier Award, a Drama Desk Award and a BroadwayWorld.com Fans' Choice Award for Billy Elliot the Musical.

In the UK, he has designed sound at the Royal Court, Royal National Theatre, Royal Shakespeare Company, Almeida Theatre, Young Vic Theatre, and in the West End, as well as many regional theatres. In September 2015 Paul was appointed an Associate Director at the National Theatre.

In the US, he has designed sound for many Broadway and off-Broadway productions, as well as other New York venues such as New York Theatre Workshop, Brooklyn Academy of Music, and Lincoln Center.

Paul studied Drama and English at The University of Hull, graduating in 1983.

London work (selected)
Measure for Measure (2015) - director: Joe Hill-Gibbins, Young Vic, London
Bakkhai (2015) - director: James Macdonald, Almeida Theatre, London
Wonder.land (2015) - director: Rufus Norris, Royal National Theatre, London
Everyman (2015) - director: Rufus Norris, Royal National Theatre, London
Skylight (2014) - director: Stephen Daldry, West End, Broadway
The Hard Problem (2015) - director: Nicholas Hytner, Royal National Theatre, London
Behind the Beautiful Forevers (2014) - director: Rufus Norris, Royal National Theatre, London
A Streetcar Named Desire (2014) - director: Benedict Andrews, Young Vic, West End, Broadway 
King Lear (2014) - director: Sam Mendes, Royal National Theatre, London
King Charles III (2014) - director: Rupert Goold, Almeida Theatre, West End, London, Broadway
The Scottsboro Boys (2014) - director: Susan Stroman, Young Vic, West End
Little Revolution (2014) - director: Joe Hill-Gibbons, Almeida Theatre, London
Great Britain (2014) - director: Nicholas Hytner, Royal National Theatre, London
Charlie and The Chocolate Factory (2013) - director: Sam Mendes, Drury Lane Theatre, London
The Audience (2013) - director: Stephen Daldry, Gielgud Theatre, London, Broadway
Dr Dee (2013) - director: Rufus Norris, Manchester International Festival and English National Opera
The Most Incredible Thing by The Pet Shop Boys, director, Javier de Frutos, Sadler's Wells, London
Feast (2013) - director: Rufus Norris, a Royal Court Theatre and Young Vic co-production, London
In The Republic of Happiness (2012) - director: Dominic Cooke, Royal Court Theatre, London
The Magistrate (2012) - director: Tim Sheader, National Theatre, London
Red Velvet (2012) by Lolita Chakabarti - director: Indhu Rubasingham, Tricycle Theatre, London
Three Sisters (2012) - director: Benedict Andrews, Young Vic, London
London Road (2012) by Alecky Blythe and Adam Cork - director: Rufus Norris, National Theatre
In Basildon (2012) - director: Dominic Cooke, Royal Court Theatre, London
The Changeling (2012) - director: Joe Hill-Gibbons, Young Vic London
Collaborators (2012) - director: Nick Hytner, National Theatre, London
Jumpy (2011) by April de Angelis - director: Nina Raine, Duke of York's Theatre and Royal Court Theatre, London
One Man, Two Guvnors (2011) by Richard Bean - director: Nick Hytner, National Theatre and Broadway transfer
When The Rain Stops Falling (2009) - director: Michael Attenborough, Almeida Theatre, London
Under The Blue Sky - director: Anna Mackmin, Duke of York's Theatre, London
The Diver (2008) - director: Hideki Noda, Soho Theatre, London
The Revenger's Tragedy (2008) - director: Melly Still, Royal National Theatre, London
The Year of Magical Thinking (2008) – director: David Hare, National Theatre, London and Booth Theatre, Broadway
Never So Good (2008) - director: Howard Davies, National Theatre, London
Happy Now? (2008) – director: Thea Sharrock, National Theatre, London
Saint Joan – director: Marianne Elliott, National Theatre, London
The Member of the Wedding – director: Matthew Dunster, Young Vic Theatre, London
Vernon God Little (2007) – director: Rufus Norris, Young Vic Theatre, London
The Respectable Wedding – director: Joe Hill-Gibbins, Young Vic Theatre, London
Nakamitsu (2007) – director: Jonathan Munby Gate Theatre, London
The Pain and The Itch (2007) – director: Dominic Cooke, Royal Court, London
Hergé's Adventures Of Tintin (2005) – director: Rufus Norris, Young Vic production, Barbican Theatre and Playhouse Theatre, London
Cymbeline (2003) - director: Dominic Cooke, Royal Shakespeare Company

Broadway work (selected)
Mary Stuart (2009) - director: Phyllida Lloyd, Broadhurst Theatre
Billy Elliot The Musical - director: Stephen Daldry, all productions, including Imperial Theatre (2008); Her Majesty's Theatre, Melbourne; Capitol Theatre, Sydney and Victoria Palace Theatre, London.
Les Liaisons Dangereuses (2008) - director: Rufus Norris, American Airlines Theatre

Other
Company by Stephen Sondheim - director: Jonathan Munby, Sheffield Crucible
The Cherry Orchard and The Winter's Tale (2009) - director: Sam Mendes, Brooklyn Academy of Music, New York, and Old Vic Theatre, London
Crestfall by Mark O'Rowe, Gate Theatre, Dublin (2003)

Awards and nominations
One Man, Two Guvnors: Tony Award nomination for Best Sound Design 2012
Saint Joan: Olivier Award for Best Sound Design 2008
Billy Elliot The Musical: Tony Award for Best Sound Design 2009, Olivier Award for Best Sound Design 2006, Helpmann Award (Australia) nomination for Best Sound Design 2008, Drama Desk Award for Best Sound Design, Broadwayworld.com Fan's Choice Award for Best Sound Design
Festen: Evening Standard Award for Best Design 2004<ref>[http://www.albemarle-london.com/awards/AwardWinners.php?Award_Type=Evening%20Standard%20Awards&Year=2004 Evening Standard Awards, 2004] albemarle-london.com, accessed May 18, 2009</ref> and Olivier Award nomination for Best Sound Design 2005The Pillowman: Drama Desk Award for Outstanding Sound Design 2005, Olivier Award nomination for Best Sound Design 2004Crestfall: Irish Times Theatre Awards nomination Judges' Special Award 2004Far Away: Lucille Lortel Award nomination 2004The Chairs: Drama Desk Award nomination for Outstanding Sound Design 2003Four Baboons Adoring The Sun'': Drama Desk Award for Outstanding Sound Design 1993

References

External links
Official site

Internet Off-Broadway Database
Credits at broadwayworld.com
Credits at playbill.com

British sound designers
Broadway sound designers
Year of birth missing (living people)
Living people
Place of birth missing (living people)
Tony Award winners